Peltasta gershensonae is a moth of the family Gelechiidae. It was described by Emelyanov and Piskunov in 1982. It is found in Mongolia.

Adults occur from mid-June to early August at elevations between 1,000 and 1,200 meters.

References

Moths described in 1982
Gelechiini